The  is a Japanese dialect spoken in Akita Prefecture.

Classification 
The dialect is a member of the Kita-Ōu dialect within the Tōhoku dialect of Eastern Japanese. It shares this grouping with dialects spoken in Aomori, north-central Iwate, coastal Yamagata and the Agakita region in Niigata Prefecture.

Sub-divisions 

 Hokubu (northern): Spoken across Kizuno, Kita-Akita and Yamamoto.
 Chūōbu (central): Spoken in Minami-Akita and Kawabe.
 Nambu (southern): Spoken across Senboku, Hiraka, Ogachi and Yuri.

Examples

References

Japanese dialects
Culture in Akita Prefecture